Officer in Charge (usually "OIC") is a very widely used term which may refer to:
 Officer in charge (police)
 Officer in Charge (Philippines), interim position in the context of Philippine governance.
 Duty officer

See also
 Officer Commanding ("OC")
 Commanding officer ("CO")

Notes
In British Commonwealth armies, the OC is often a Major, and the CO a Lieutenant Colonel